The Glover Prize is an Australian annual art prize awarded for paintings of the landscape of Tasmania The prize was inaugurated in 2004 by the John Glover Society, based in Evandale, Tasmania, in honour of the work of British-born landscape painter John Glover, who lived and painted in the area from 1832 until his death in 1849. The current prize amount of A$ 50,000 is the highest for landscape painting in Australia. The 2012 award was controversial: the winning picture included a depiction of convicted Port Arthur massacre spree killer Martin Bryant in the landscape of Port Arthur.

History

John Glover lived the last 17 years of his life in northern Tasmania.  In 2001, "Mount Wellington and Hobart Town with Natives Dancing and Bathing", one of his many landscape works that were sent back to England, was sold for more than $1.5 million.
The Glover Prize has been described as "a little heart beat, a funny little committee that had a little bit of money and had an idea". By 2019, the prize had attracted 480 entrants.

Conditions for the prize
The John Glover Society has specified that the prize is limited to works depicting Tasmanian landscapes.

Winners

2004
The winner of the inaugural Prize was Longford based artist Michael McWilliams, for the painting  Bandicoot on a Log Bandicoots are small to medium-sized terrestrial marsupials endemic to Australia.
The painting now hangs in the departure lounge of Launceston Airport.
His acrylics on linen work Bush Blankets was awarded the $3 000 "People's Choice" 2012 award.

2005
In the second year of the contest, there were more than 130 entries. The winner was Stephen Charles Lees for the painting Wishbone Ridge. Lees, who was born in Sydney, had lived in Tasmanian since 1992.

2006
Hobart artist David Keeling was awarded the third Glover Prize for 45 Minute Walk - Narawntapu.  The winning work was of orthodox oils on canvas medium. The landscape depicted is part of the Narawntapu National Park

2007
The winner of the Prize in 2007 was Raymond Arnold, a Queenstown-based printmaker.
The painting in acrylics, entitled Western Mountain Ecology, depicts stacks of freshly-sawn Huon pine. The prize amount was then $30 000.

2008
Hobart Art teacher Neil Haddon was awarded the 2008 Glover Prize for his work Purblind (opiate) The work is enamels on aluminium, and references the cultivation of opium poppies in Tasmanian opium poppy farming industry.

2009
Hobart-based artist Matthew Armstrong was awarded the 2009 Prize for the work Transformed at Night ahead of more than 250 other entrants. Armstrong's work depicted Mellifont Street, Hobart.

2010
Queensland-based artist Ian Waldron was selected from among 272 entries to become the first Indigenous Australian to win the Prize with his work Walach Dhaarr (Cockle Creek), a piece created on Tasmanian oak. "Walach Dhaarr" in the language of the Aboriginal Tasmanians of that region means "Cockle Creek", a location in Tasmania that Waldron described as significant, both archaeologically and as a "site of positive exchange" between indigenous people and French mariners during the late 18th century.

2011
The 2011 prize was awarded to Launceston artist Josh Foley for Gee’s Lookout. The oil painting included pumice in its media. The painting depicts a disused building on the hill overlooking Cataract Gorge in Launceston.

2012
The 2012 winner was awarded to Launceston born Sydney resident artist Rodney Pople for the work Port Arthur.

2013
The 2013 competition attracted 303 entrants; the prize was awarded to Sydney artist Janet Laurence for a work titled Plants Eye View, and depicted a close-up view of flora from the Tarkine region of North-West Tasmania.

2014
The 2014 prize had 42 finalists. The winning work was Looking south from the Labyrinth (to Mt Olympus & Lake St Clair) by New Norfolk born artist Mark Rodda.

2015
The winner of the 2015 prize was Nigel Hewitt for his work Woven, created using wood ash from the 2013 Dunalley bushfires. The work, chosen from 282 entries and 42 finalists, features a forest at Mt Barrow in northern Tasmania. Hewitt divides his time between Perth, Western Australia and Hobart, Tasmania.

2016 
In 2016 the prize attracted more than 280 entries and was won by David Keeling, making him the first artist to win the prize twice; he also won the prize in 2006. Keeling's painting titled, Low tide, soft breeze, depicted a coastal track in the Narawntapu National Park, an area that he often uses as a source of inspiration.

2017 
2017 saw the Glover Prize awarded to Raymond Arnold, making him a two-time winner of the award, having achieved this also in 2007. Arnold's work was titled La Barque de Dante/Macquarie Harbour Party Barge.

2018
The 2018 Glover Prize was awarded to Halinka Orszulok for the work Ponies, a painting of playground equipment at Cataract Gorge, Launceston at night. Orszulok's work Wreck was one of the 35 finalists in the 2014 Sir John Sulman Prize.

2019
After a record-breaking year with over 480 paintings entered, the 2019 Glover Prize was awarded to Piers Greville for the work Pedder Prime Cuts, an oil and acrylic painting of Lake Pedder, a Tasmanian glacial lake.

2020
The 2020 Glover Prize was awarded to Tasmanian artist Robert O'Connor, for his piece titled: 'Somewhere in the midlands'. O'Connor's painting depicted a large hunk of meat sitting on a bed of mashed potatoes with peas and gravy, shown in front of a Tasmanian landscape. O'Connor had been a finalist in the Glover Prize four times prior to 2020.

2021
The 2021 Glover Prize was won by Hobart artist Sebastian Galloway for a work titled View of Mt. Lyell through an Acid Raindrop. The work is oil paint on copper; the artist stated that the copper medium reflected the mining history of Queenstown.

2022
The 2022 Glover Prize was won by Victorian artist Jennifer Riddle with her work titled Wanderings of the Past and Now. The work is a synthetic polymer on canvas, and depicts Port Davey, in Tasmania.

2012 award controversy
The 2012 award-winning painting depicted Port Arthur and included a representation of Martin Bryant holding a gun. The award received criticism. A former police officer who attended the scene of the Port Arthur Massacre described the work as insensitive and outrageous. The CEO of the Port Arthur Historic Site Management Authority was reported as stating that depictions of the massacre were unhelpful to those it affected. Pople addressed the criticism, arguing that the depiction of Byant was a reminder of the brutality of the Port Arthur Prison Colony within a green "surreal beauty" landscape.

References

External links
 
 Image of Rodney Pople in front of controversial 2012 prize-winning painting from Australian Broadcasting Corporation website
 Nigel Hewitt with his 2015 prize-winning image, Woven from Australian Broadcasting Corporation website

Australian art awards
Awards established in 2004
2004 establishments in Australia